Terrance John Cox (born July 18, 1963) is an American politician who served as the U.S. representative for California's 21st congressional district from 2019 to 2021. The son of Chinese American and Filipino American parents, Cox was elected to the House of Representatives in 2018. A member of the Democratic Party, he was defeated in his 2020 rematch with Republican David Valadao.

In August 2022, Cox was arrested by the Federal Bureau of Investigation on 15 counts of wire fraud, 11 counts of money laundering, one count of financial institution fraud, and one count of campaign contribution fraud.

Early life and career
Cox was born in Walnut Creek, California. His father is a chemical engineering professor who immigrated from China, and his mother is from the Philippines. He received a Bachelor of Science in chemical engineering from the University of Nevada, Reno in 1986 and a Master of Business Administration from Southern Methodist University. He started two businesses that process nuts and also managed a community development enterprise.

U.S. House of Representatives

Elections

2018

Cox began this congressional bid in 2017, competing in California's 10th district primary race against several other Democratic candidates.

However, Emilio Huerta, the only Democratic challenger in the 21st district, withdrew from the race prior to the filing deadline to appear on the primary election ballot. Cox withdrew from the 10th district race to instead run in the 21st district against incumbent Representative David Valadao. He and Valadao advanced from the June 5 top-two primary election to the November 6 general election.

On election night, and for several days after the election, Valadao had more votes, but Cox's vote count pulled into the lead on November 26. By November 28, major news sources called the race for Cox, with Valadao conceding the race the following week. Cox's victory was considered an upset, as most election forecasters rated Valadao as the favorite. Cox won by a narrow 862 vote margin.

2020

Cox ran for reelection in 2020 against Valadao, whom he beat in 2018.

Cox was criticized for pushing to gain preferential access into Yosemite National Park over the July 4 weekend. In October 2020, Cox's campaign acknowledged fabricating a tweet to make it appear as if Valadao had retweeted a message from President Trump saying "California is going to hell. Vote Trump!"

Valadao defeated Cox in the election. The Associated Press called the election for Valadao on November 27, 2020, more than three weeks after the election, and Cox conceded defeat on December 4, 2020. Cox underperformed Biden's near 11 point win margin by about 5 points, leaving Valadao with the most Democratic district of any congressional Republican according to Cook Political Report's Partisan Voter Index.

2022 

Shortly after his loss in the 2020 election, Cox announced his intention to run for the seat again in 2022. However, on November 17, 2021, Cox endorsed Rudy Salas removing himself from the contest.

Committee assignments 
 Committee on Agriculture
 Subcommittee on Livestock and Foreign Agriculture
 Subcommittee on Biotechnology, Horticulture, and Research
 Committee on Natural Resources
 Subcommittee on Oversight and Investigations (Chair)
 Subcommittee on Water, Oceans and Wildlife

Legal troubles 
When Cox made an updated financial disclosure in 2019, it was discovered that he had failed to disclose business interests as a candidate in 2018. It was also discovered that Cox failed to timely pay wages owed to three employees of Constellation Mines, a company where Cox was a director until early 2019.

In January 2020, the IRS placed a tax lien on Cox for approximately $87,000 in unpaid income tax for 2016 and approximately $57,000 in unpaid income tax for 2017. Cox was also subject to a $50,000 IRS tax lien in 2017. In March 2020, Cox voted against a bill that would require members of Congress to disclose tax liens.

In August 2021, state filings revealed that 35% of the spending from Cox's "VoterPAC", created with funds remaining from his campaign, went to MJTJ, LLC, an organization wholly-owned by Cox that was originally created for real estate investments. VoterPAC was created to engage in voter registration. MJTJ, LLC, was reportedly illegally created for fundraising purposes.

In August 2022, Cox was arrested by the Federal Bureau of Investigation on 15 counts of wire fraud, 11 counts of money laundering, one count of financial institution fraud, and one count of campaign contribution fraud. If convicted, Cox faces up to 20 years in prison and a fine of $250,000.

Electoral history

Personal life
Cox has four children with his wife, pediatrician Kathleen Murphy.

See also
 List of Asian Americans and Pacific Islands Americans in the United States Congress

References

External links

 Campaign website

1963 births
American chemical engineers
California politicians of Chinese descent
American politicians of Filipino descent
California politicians of Filipino descent
Living people
Members of the United States Congress of Chinese descent
Members of the United States Congress of Filipino descent
Democratic Party members of the United States House of Representatives from California
Asian-American members of the United States House of Representatives
People from Walnut Creek, California
People from Fresno, California
Southern Methodist University alumni
University of Nevada, Reno alumni